A cello is stringed musical instrument.

Cello may also refer to:
 CELLO, a term for an esophageal abnormality
 Cello (album), an album by cellist David Darling
 Cello (film), a 2005 South Korean horror film
 Cello (TV series), a Lebanese drama television series with Ali Saad
 Cello (web browser), an early web browser and Gopher client for Windows 3.1
 Cello Dias, bass guitarist for American alternative rock band Against All Will
 Mashymre Cello, fictional character in the Gundam ZZ series
 Nadia Di Cello (born 1989), Argentine actress
 Sello, a large shopping centre in Espoo, Finland
 A former brand of high-end audio equipment by Mark Levinson (audio equipment designer)

See also
 chello, an internet service provider
 Chelo (disambiguation)
 Cellophane (disambiguation)